A case interview is a job interview in which the applicant is presented with a challenging business scenario that he/she must investigate and propose a solution to. Case interviews are designed to test the candidate's analytical skills and "soft" skills within a realistic business context. The case is often a business situation or a business case that the interviewer has worked on in real life.

Case interviews are mostly used in hiring for management consulting jobs. Consulting firms use case interviews to evaluate candidate's analytical ability and problem-solving skills; they are looking not for a "correct" answer but for an understanding of how the applicant thinks and how the applicant approaches problems.

Method
During case interviews, interviewers are generally looking for the following skills:
 Numerical and verbal reasoning skills
 Communication and presentation skills
 Business skills and commercial awareness

Candidates are often asked to estimate a specific number, often a commercial figure (such as market size or profitability) or determine action plans to remedy a business problem (such as low profitability or decreasing market share). Questions are generally ambiguous and require interviewees to ask questions or make assumptions to make a reasonable, supported argument to their solutions. Candidates are expected to demonstrate reasoning rather than to produce the exact answer.

A case interview can also be conducted as a group exercise. Here several candidates are given some briefing materials on a business problem and asked to discuss and agree upon a solution. The interviewers normally sit around the exterior of the room as silent observers. They assess candidates' communication and interaction as well as analytical thinking and commercial awareness. Interviewers "red flag" candidates who try to dominate the conversation; consultants work in teams so it's important to be a team player.

Frameworks used by business analysts 
An example of a framework used by business analysts is:
 Benchmarking: Comparison of metrics to competitors
 Balanced scorecard: Tracking key objectives as a prevention method
 Porter’s five forces: Industry analysis to assess potential company profitability 
 The General Electric-McKinsey nine-box matrix: Used to help assess opportunities
 The BCG growth-share matrix: Used to assess relative product line strength
 Core Competencies: Define proficiencies in areas unique to the company

See also
Case method
Management consulting

References

Further reading 
Chapter 5, "Mastering the Case Interview", in Management Consulting: A Complete Guide to the Industry, Sugata Biswas and Daryl Twitchell, John Wiley & Sons (January 1999), 
Nina Munk and Suzanne Oliver, "Think Fast", Forbes, March 24, 1997, pp. 146–51.
Tim Darling, How to Get Into the Top Consulting Firms: A Surefire Case Interview Method - 2nd Edition, 2011, page 21, 
Tom Rochtus, Case Interview Success - 2nd Edition, 2011, page 27, 
David Ohrvall, Crack the Case System: Complete Case Interview Prep, 2011, page 97, 
Mark P. Cosentino, Case in Point: Complete Case Interview Preparation, 8th Edition, 2013, page 12,

External links 
"Management Consulting Case Interview Sample Questions", by Northwestern University Consulting Club
"The Case Interview", University of Maryland Student Career Center, retrieved January 1, 2008, via archive.org
"Case Interview Resources" (pdf), MIT Careers Office
"Case Interview Preparation Plan", by ConsultingCasePro

Management consulting firms
Job interview